China National Maritime Day, officially referred to as Maritime Day of China, also known as China Maritime Day, Maritime Day in China, is celebrated July 11, 2005, commemorating marked Zheng He's first voyage.  The date marks the 600th anniversary of the ocean voyages of Zheng He, the Ming dynasty (1368–1644) navigator, who went on seven voyages to show China's might to the rest of the world, under the command of Yongle Emperor. These voyages sought to prove to the Chinese people that the usurper Yongle was worthy of the throne and the gods accepted him with the Mandate of Heaven. The celebration's creation honors China's commitment to the International Maritime Organization, of which it is a member.

See also

Maritime Day

References

External links 
  

Maritime culture
Public holidays in China
July observances
2005 establishments in China
Treasure voyages
Summer events in China